The Monument to Giovanni Meli is a bronze monumental sculpture, dedicated to the Sicilian poet , erected in 1909 on Piazza Stazione Lolli, near Via Dante, in central Palermo, Sicily.

History
The bronze statue of the poet Giovanni Meli (who lived 1740-1815) was sculpted by Pasquale Civiletti and rises on a marble plinth. The poet holds a book in his left hand, and partly steps forward, though his gaze is melancholically downcast. A second statue to the poet, this time sitting, is found in the Palazzo Pretorio, Palermo. The poet is buried in the church of San Domenico, Palermo.

References

Monuments and memorials in Palermo
1909 in Italy